Ocenebra hispidula is a species of sea snail, a marine gastropod mollusk in the family Muricidae, the murex snails or rock snails.

Description
The length of the shell attains 21.9 mm.

Distribution
This marine species occurs in the Mediterranean Sea off Tunisia.

References

 Settepassi F. (1977). Atlante Malacologico. I molluschi marini viventi nel Mediterraneo, volume II. 304 pp. Museo di Zoologia, Roma

External links
 Pallary, P. (1904-1906). Addition à la faune malacologique du Golfe de Gabès. Journal de Conchyliologie. 52(3): 212-248, pl. 7 [25 October 1904; 54(2): 77-124, pl. 4]
  Barco, A.; Herbert, G.; Houart, R.; Fassio, G. & Oliverio, M. (2017). A molecular phylogenetic framework for the subfamily Ocenebrinae (Gastropoda, Muricidae). Zoologica Scripta. 46 (3): 322-335.

Gastropods described in 1904
Ocenebra